Meron Getnet is an Ethiopian actress, political activist, journalist and poet. She was known for her critique toward governmental stance during Meles Zenawi administration. A revered film and TV star in Ethiopia, she is best known for her role as Meaza Ashenafi in the critically acclaimed film Difret.

Film career 
Starting in 2013, Meron Getnet starred in the Ethiopian drama TV series Dana in which she played a reporter named Helina.

Meron made her debut onto the international film scene in Difret in 2014, in which she plays Meron Ashenafi, a female lawyer who vigorously fights patriarchal tradition.

In September 2014, at the premiere of Difret in Addis Ababa, the screening was abruptly cancelled due to a court order against its showing in Ethiopia. This left those in the audience stunned with Meron, who was in attendance, visibly distraught.

Filmography

References

Year of birth missing (living people)
Living people
Ethiopian people
Ethiopian actresses
Ethiopian film actresses
20th-century Ethiopian actresses
21st-century Ethiopian actresses
People from Addis Ababa
Ethiopian poets
Ethiopian women poets
Ethiopian journalists
Ethiopian women journalists
Ethiopian activists
Ethiopian women activists